The following is a list of notable deaths in March 1991.

Entries for each day are listed alphabetically by surname. A typical entry lists information in the following sequence:
 Name, age, country of citizenship at birth, subsequent country of citizenship (if applicable), reason for notability, cause of death (if known), and reference.

March 1991

1
Katharine Blake, 69, British actress (Anne of the Thousand Days, Within These Walls, Hammer the Toff).
Mamie Geraldine Neale Bledsoe, 91, American educator and civil rights activist.
Frank Esler-Smith, 42, English keyboardist, AIDS.
Eugen Kamber, 66, Swiss Olympic cyclist (1948).
Edwin H. Land, 81, American inventor and businessman (Polaroid Corporation).
Leonid Markov, 63, Soviet actor, stomach cancer.
Marie Rossi, 32, U.S. Army pilot, helicopter crash one day after Operation Desert Storm.
Louis Saguer, 83, German-French composer.

2
Arthur Attwell, 70, British Anglican prelate.
Elmer Bischoff, 74, American artist.
Serge Gainsbourg, 62, French musician, heart attack.
Frank S. Giles Jr., 75, American politician.
Mary Howard, 83, British novelist.
Clark R. Mollenhoff, 69, American journalist, cancer.
Josef Stalder, 72, Swiss Olympic gymnast (1948, 1952).
Lou Sullivan, 39, American author and transgender activist, AIDS.
Eduard Vanaaseme, 92, Estonian Olympic weightlifter (1924).
Ranjan Wijeratne, 59, Sri Lankan politician, explosion.

3
Nikolai Bagley, 54, Soviet Olympic basketball player (1964).
James Fullerton, 81, American ice hockey coach.
Howard Head, 76, American aeronautical engineer.
Arthur Murray, 95, Hungarian-American businessman.
Sal Nistico, 50, American saxophonist.
William Penney, Baron Penney, 81, English mathematician.
Johnny Revolta, 79, American golfer.
John Spotton, 64, Canadian filmmaker, drowned.
Antoine Tassy, 66, Haitian football player.

4
Godfrey Bryan, 88, English cricket player.
Vance Colvig, 72, American actor and voice actor (The Yogi Bear Show, UHF, The Quick Draw McGraw Show), cancer.
Michael Hardwick, 66, English author.
Pepe Iglesias, 76, Argentine comedian.
Ellamae Ellis League, 91, American architect.
Kenneth Lindsay, 93, British politician.
Jean Loubignac, 89, French film director and screenwriter.

5
Brian Batsford, 80, English politician.
Steve Calvert, 74, American actor, heart attack.
August de Schryver, 92, Belgian politician.
Ian McLellan Hunter, 75, English screenwriter (Roman Holiday), heart attack.
Helmut Sick, 81, German-Brazilian ornithologist.

6
Habib Chatty, 74, Tunisian politician and diplomat.
Tan Chye Cheng, 80, Singaporean politician, heart failure.
Keith Collin, 54, English Olympic diver (1960).
Herm Lee, 59, American football player.
Horace Winchell Magoun, 83, American medical researcher.
Larry Olsonoski, 65, American football player.
Salvo Randone, 84, Italian actor.

7
John Bartha, 76, Hungarian actor (The Good, the Bad and the Ugly).
Cool Papa Bell, 87, American baseball player.
Morton Fine, 74, American television writer (I Spy, Bold Venture, The Streets of San Francisco).
Raymond Joseph Gallagher, 78, American Roman Catholic prelate.
John Harris, 74, British novelist.
Al Klink, 75, American saxophonist.
Jean Piveteau, 91, French paleontologist.
Josef Páleníček, 76, Czech pianist and composer.
Bruno Venturini, 79, Italian football player.

8
John Bellairs, 53, American author (The House with a Clock in Its Walls, The Face in the Frost, The Lamp from the Warlock's Tomb), cardiovascular disease.
Michel d'Ornano, 66, French politician, struck by vehicle.
Maria Eisner, 82, Italian-American photographer.
Ludwig Fischer, 75, German racing driver.
Donald M. Frame, 79–80, American literary scholar.
Roman Brother, 29, American Thoroughbred racehorse, horse colic.

9
Ely do Amparo, 69, Brazilian footballer.
Jack Meyer, 85, English cricket player and educator.
Max Fourny, 86, French art collector and racing driver.
Ralph Green, 79, Australian footballer.
Jim Hardin, 47, American baseball player, plane crash.
Tomojirō Ikenouchi, 84, Japanese composer, cerebral hemorrhage.
Fritz Neumark, 90, German economist.

10
Mildred Eldridge, 81, British artist.
Fumio Ito, 51, Japanese racing motorcyclist.
Etheridge Knight, 59, American poet, lung cancer.
Elie Siegmeister, 82, American composer.
Paul Ukena, 69, American opera singer, heart failure.

11
Robert A. Cook, 78, American academic and radio broadcaster.
Hector Crawford, 77, Australian entrepreneur.
Abul Kashem, 70, Bangladeshi linguist.
Nikolaos Matussi, 91, Greek politician and Aromanian paramilitary leader during World War II.
Maria Reining, 87, Austrian singer.

12
José Maria Antunes, 77, Portuguese football player and a manager.
LeRoy Collins, 82, American politician, governor of Florida (1955–1961), cancer.
Ralph Henry Carless Davis, 72, British historian.
Étienne Decroux, 92, French actor and mime artist.
Ragnar Granit, 90, Finnish-Swedish physiologist, Nobel Prize recipient (1967).
William Heinesen, 91, Faroese writer.
Michael Langdon, 70, British opera singer.
Muhammad Musa, 82, Pakistani general.
Nicola Rossi-Lemeni, 70, Turkish-American opera singer.

13
Donald Kaberry, Baron Kaberry of Adel, 83, British politician, homicide.
Josef Manger, 77, German weightlifter and Olympic champion.
Jimmy McPartland, 83, American cornetist, lung cancer.
Max Poll, 82, Belgian ichthyologist.
Walter Presch, 80, Austrian football player.
Göran Strindberg, 74, Swedish cinematographer.

14
Howard Ashman, 40, American lyricist (Beauty and the Beast, Little Shop of Horrors, The Little Mermaid), Oscar winner (1990, 1992).
Roy Hall, 71, American racing driver.
Ebenezer Joshua, 82, Vincentian politician.
Doc Pomus, 65, American blues musician, lung cancer.
Margery Sharp, 86, English writer (The Rescuers).
Maurice Zolotow, 77, American writer and biographer.

15
G. Aravindan, 56, Indian filmmaker, musician, cartoonist, and painter, heart attack.
Miodrag Bulatović, 61, Yugoslav novelist.
Robert Busnel, 76, French basketball player, traffic collision.
Bud Freeman, 84, American jazz musician.
Robin Hill, 91, British biochemist.
Stanisław Lorentz, 91, Polish art historian.
Eileen Sedgwick, 92, American silent film actress, pneumonia.
Vladimir Seleznev, 62, Soviet realist painter.
George Sherman, 82, American filmmaker.
Gerd Völs, 81, German Olympic rower (1936).
Cloyd Webb, 49, Canadian football player.

16
Chris Austin, 27, American country musician, plane crash.
Jean Bellette, 82, Australian artist.
Urbain Caffi, 74, Italian-French racing cyclist.
Rowland Baring, 3rd Earl of Cromer, 72, British diplomat.
Raymond Fletcher, 69, British politician and alleged spy.
James Darcy Freeman, 83, Australian Roman Catholic cardinal.
Trude Herr, 63, German actress.
Walter Georg Kühne, 80, German paleontologist.
Jan Herman van Roijen Jr., 85, Dutch diplomat.

17
Carl Aarvold, 83, English barrister.
Pilar Primo de Rivera, 83, Spanish politician.
Carlo Donat-Cattin, 71, Italian politician.
Peter Gordon, 69, New Zealand politician.

18
Aladár Bitskey, 85, Hungarian Olympic swimmer (1928).
Vilma Bánky, 90, Hungarian-American silent film actress, cardiopulmonary failure.
Landis Gores, 71, American architect.
Carl Jensen, 81, Danish Olympic boxer (1932).
Dezider Kardoš, 76, Czechoslovak composer.
Narda Onyx, 59, Estonian-American actress.
Herbert Sandberg, 82, German artist.
John D. Voelker, 87, American judge and author.

19
Justus Buchler, 76, American philosopher.
Richard Hawkey, 67, English cricket player.
Bruno Kessler, 67, Italian politician.
Russ Thomas, 66, American football player.
Sunday Wilshin, 86, British actress and radio presenter.

20
Billy Butler, 66, American guitarist.
George Friedrichs, 51, American Olympic sailor (1968).
George W. Grider, 78, American politician, member of the U.S. House of Representatives (1965–1967).
David Marshall Lang, 66, British historian and academic.
John Palmer MacBeth, 69, Canadian politician.
Minatullah Rahmani, 77, Indian Islamic scholar.
Nick Vanoff, 61, American theatre producer, cardiac arrest.

21
Almé Z, 24, French sport horse.
Nan Britton, 94, American secretary, mistress of Warren G. Harding.
Vedat Dalokay, 63, Turkish politician and architect, traffic collision.
Leo Fender, 81, American musician and businessman (Fender), Parkinson's disease.
Oscar Heidenstam, 80, British bodybuilder.
Bill Sweeney, 54, Canadian ice hockey player (New York Rangers).

22
Léon Balcer, 73, Canadian politician.
Jimmy Boyd, 83, Scottish football player.
Paul Engle, 82, American writer.
Dave Guard, 56, American musician, lymphoma.
Gloria Holden, 87, English-American actress, heart attack.
Adrie Lasterie, 47, Dutch Olympic swimmer (1964).
Albert McKinley Rains, 89, American politician, member of the U.S. House of Representatives (1945–1965).
R. L. Ryan, 44, American actor (The Toxic Avenger, Birdy, Street Trash), heart attack.

23
Elisaveta Bagriana, 97, Bulgarian poet.
Susumu Fujita, 79, Japanese actor (The Hidden Fortress, The Human Condition, Mothra vs. Godzilla), liver cancer.
Bill Gunn, 59, Australian football player.
Guy Benton Johnson, 90, American sociologist.
Mona Maris, 87, Argentine film actress, lung disease.
Neta Snook Southern, 95, American aviation pioneer.
Innozenz Stangl, 80, German Olympic gymnast (1936).
Pauline Vanier, 92, Canadian humanitarian and academic.
Lars Wolfbrandt, 62, Swedish Olympic sprinter (1948, 1952).

24
Maudie Edwards, 84, Welsh actress (Welsh Rarebit, Coronation Street).
Albert Järvinen, 40, Finnish guitarist, heart attack.
John Kerr, 76, Australian politician, governor-general (1974–1977), brain cancer.
Max Truex, 55, American long-distance runner and Olympian.
Adrie Zwartepoorte, 74, Dutch Olympic cyclist (1936).

25
Rusty Bryant, 61, American jazz musician.
Robert Duis, 77, German Olympic basketball player (1936).
Margaret Hoffman, 79, American Olympic swimmer (1928, 1932).
Vitaliy Holubyev, 65, Soviet football player.
Eileen Joyce, 83, Australian pianist.
Marcel Lefebvre, 85, French Roman Catholic prelate, bone cancer.
Wolfgang Müller-Wiener, 67, German architecture historian, archaeologist and Byzantinist.
Mohammed Ahmed Sadek, 73, Egyptian general.
Sandy Williams, 84, American trombonist.

26
Karel Burkert, 81, Czechoslovak footballer.
Warren Chappell, 86–87, American illustrator and teacher, heart failure.
Riccardo Fellini, 69, Italian film actor.
Paul Gayten, 71, American musician.
Angus Charles Graham, 71, Welsh sinologist.
Doug Herland, 39, American Olympic rower (1984).
Henri Lhote, 88, French ethnographer and explorer.
P. L. A. Somapala, 69, Sri Lankan singer.
R. Sudarsanam, 76, Indian composer.

27
Ralph Bates, 51, English actor, pancreatic cancer.
Alfredo Campoli, 84, Italian-British violinist.
Jack Davis, 74, Canadian politician.
Heinrich Gerlach, 82, German soldier and author.
Helmut Kronsbein, 76, German footballer.
Aldo Ray, 64, American actor (Pat and Mike, The Marrying Kind, The Secret of NIMH), throat cancer.
Hans-Henning Freiherr von Beust, 77, German Luftwaffe officer during World War II.

28
Griffith Buck, 75–76, American horticulturist.
Maude Hutchins, 92, American artist.
Carlos Montalbán, 86, Mexican-American actor (The Harder They Fall, Bananas, The Out-of-Towners), heart failure.
Lyall Wilkes, 76, English politician.

29
Karl Aletter, 84, German Olympic rower (1928, 1932).
Lee Atwater, 40, American political consultant, chairman of the Republican National Committee (1989–1991), brain cancer.
Guy Bourdin, 62, French photographer, cancer.
John Daniel Hayes, 89, American naval admiral and historian.
Mikaela, 55, Spanish singer, leukemia.
Hans Stark, 69, German war criminal.
John Stradling Thomas, 65, Welsh politician.

30
Silvia Monfort, 67, French actress, lung cancer.
Sid Schacht, 73, American baseball player.
Bud Taylor, 74, American golfer, suicide by carbon monoxide poisoning.
Nikola Todev, 62, Bulgarian actor.
Cheng Zihua, 85, Chinese politician.

31
Emilian Bratu, 86, Romanian chemical engineer.
John Carter, 61, American jazz musician.
Stanley Diamond, 69, American poet and anthropologist.
Consuelo Frank, 78, Mexican actress.
Josip Jović, 21, Yugoslav Croatian police officer, shot.
Arnold Walter Lawrence, 90, British archaeologist.

References 

1991-03
 03